Thames Gateway is a term applied to an area around the Thames Estuary in the context of discourse around regeneration and further urbanisation. It stretches from Westferry in Tower Hamlets to the Isle of Sheppey/Southend-on-Sea and extends across three ceremonial counties.

Rationale
The area was designated during the early years of the Blair ministry as a national priority for urban regeneration because it contained large amounts of brownfield land and to take advantage of rail capacity improvements created at Stratford and in parts of Kent, by the High Speed 1 railway (officially known as the Channel Tunnel Rail Link). The term was first coined by the UK government, with the government and others also use the term Thames Estuary to apply to the area. Much of the brownfield land has now been redeveloped.

Scope
The Thames Gateway has a population of over 3 million and comprises generally Thameside belts of 16 local government districts:

Profile
The immediate settlements next to the types of land indicated, not taking the authorities as a whole, contains about half of the population of those authorities: 1.6 million people and contained in the 2000 survey some of the most deprived wards in the country, characterised by lack of access to public transport, services, employment and affordable quality housing, in particular having many overspill estates from earlier slum clearance and London's urban planning – examples being from Thamesmead to Southend on Sea.

Its boundary was drawn to capture the riverside strip that formerly hosted many land-occupying industries, serving London and the South East, whose decline has left a patchy legacy of dereliction and contaminated land.  Striking precursor examples of development are those pioneered at Canary Wharf and on the Greenwich Peninsula, which the governments since 2000 have aimed to reflect across this area (having widespread comparable land use to those tracts of land).

Its brownfield land, farmland and wild salt marshland has been seen by successive governments and planners as having potential to act as a catalyst for the regeneration and growth and for the social advancement of the area, helping to alleviate some of the growth pressures on London and the South East.  Amid steep house price inflation and an economic boom in 2004 the government also expressed the firm belief that new private sector housing here and elsewhere would reduce that inflation.

Parts of the area are of settled character and/or already densely populated with little scope for housing developments: Southend-on-Sea, for example, is the eighth most densely populated district in the country outside London and mass expansion is not desired owing to the river at the south, the need for leisure space and animal habitat (mostly in the buffer zones separating communities) and an economic desire and legal demand to preserve the existing character of housing estates.

Administration and delivery
The Department for Communities and Local Government is responsible for co-ordinating the project.

The Thames Gateway project aims to improve the economy of the region through the development of marshland, farmland and brownfield land, through major transport infrastructure provision and the renaissance of existing urban conurbations. 

Comparisons may be drawn with developments east of Paris along the Marne valley, which applied to a significantly smaller volume of land.

Formerly the development was in part delivered by the three regional development agencies: the London Development Agency (LDA – part of the Greater London Authority), the East of England Development Agency (EEDA) and the South East England Development Agency (SEEDA), as well as the national regeneration agency, English Partnerships.

Development that is supplemental to councils' own development plans is delivered through Local Authorities (Councils), special purpose development corporations and local enterprise partnerships, all of which are eligible for grants from government departments funded by HM Treasury.  Additional government funds were supplied to the Regional Development Agencies who supported some projects in the Gateway.

Former redevelopment zones
Formerly, the development was split into zones each with a different agency responsible for delivery. The zones were:

Developments

Before 2003 most conspicuous development was situated west of Beckton. There have been substantial housing schemes at Chafford Hundred, Chatham and Greenhithe and there is a large shopping centre at Bluewater.

Environmental implications
Proposals for a large international airport on Cliffe Marshes were dropped from the government's white paper on air transport in 2003 after they were rejected by local residents, the local council, as well as conservation charities such as the RSPB. The plan, which would have required the raising the ground level by 15 m. was also rejected by the Confederation of British Industry as too expensive.

On the question of airport capacity, the Government had established the independent Airports Commission, headed until 2015 by Sir Howard Davies. The Commission examined the nature, scale and timing of any requirement for additional capacity to maintain the UK's global hub status. The Aviation Policy Framework of March 2013 was an important piece in the jigsaw, setting out the principles which the commission would take into account in presenting its recommendations reported in 2013 and in 2015. The options included an outside possibility of a floating airport off the Isle of Sheppey.

Historically the north of Kent has always been marshland but has been coming under great pressure by developers. A public inquiry found in favour of a rail freight depot proposed by  ProLogis  at Howbury in Slade Green. The proposal was to develop part of the Metropolitan Green Belt in the Crayford Marshes beside the existing railway depot. Roxhill Developments Ltd.  had sought to modify the planned 149 acre "sustainable distribution park with modern multi modal connections" since at least 2015.

The London Development Agency perceived some strategic merit in the proposals, but local councillors were not convinced that such a depot would truly encourage train movements as an alternative to road haulage.  This scepticism arose partly because the railways in the area are heavily used by scheduled passenger trains, to the extent that the projected Crossrail programme seemed unlikely to progress to Dartford unless new tracks were laid to boost local rail capacity. The ProLogis appeal was upheld by a 2007 Public Inquiry on the basis that the proposal supported the Energy policy of the United Kingdom and generated new jobs. Counter-arguments included that eventual warehouse occupiers would not use the site in the manner suggested, that continuous noise levels would exceed WHO Community Noise Guidelines at homes in Moat Lane and that night-time noise levels risked generating complaints from residents at Moat Lane and Oak Road.

The Environment Agency advised that future development in the "Thames Gateway" must go hand-in-hand with flood risk management, and take account of future plans for flood protection. The Agency insisted it was important that effective flood risk management of the whole Estuary be not prejudiced by premature decisions and developments.

The Government addressed some of these environmental concerns by designating the Thames Gateway as the UK's "eco-region", first announced in the 2007 Thames Gateway Delivery Plan. The objective of the "eco-region" was to protect and enhance the sustainability of the "Thames Gateway" in terms of environmental quality, carbon reduction, and support for "green" economic development.  This vision was elaborated in the 2008 Thames Gateway "eco-region prospectus", and implementation efforts were led by the Homes and Communities Agency with support across government and [unspecified] local stakeholders.

Cultural references
The liminal and sometimes bleak settings of the Thames Gateway have inspired several cultural works.
 Nicola Barker has written a loose trilogy of novels termed Thames Gateway.
 Iain Sinclair's novel Dining on Stones follows the A13 from London to Essex.
 Graham Swift's novel Last Orders involves a journey down the A2/M2 corridor from London to Margate.

References

External links
 Clark, Andrew (16 December 2002). Thumbs down to Kent airport. The Guardian (UK national title)
Thames Gateway London Partnership
Wildlife Gateway – Providing a resource for information on development with wildlife in mind
Thames Gateway South Essex Partnership 
Thames Gateway Kent Partnership
Greengrid – Connecting green spaces in South Essex
Thames Gateway Forum
Medway Renaissance
Invest Thames Gateway website
'KenEx' Thames Gateway Tramlink Ltd - Providing sustainable public transport within the Thames Gateway Development Area

 
Redevelopment projects in London
Town and country planning in England
Housing in London
Geography of Kent
Geography of Essex
Geography of the London Borough of Tower Hamlets
Geography of the London Borough of Newham
Geography of the London Borough of Havering
Geography of the London Borough of Barking and Dagenham
Geography of the London Borough of Bexley
Geography of the Royal Borough of Greenwich
Thurrock
Medway
Gateway, Thames Gateway
London sub-regions
Borough of Swale